The women's 800 metres event at the 2023 European Athletics Indoor Championships was held on 2 March 2023 at 19:40 (heats), on 4 March at 19:15 (semi-finals), and on 5 March at 20:35 (final) local time.

Medalists

Records

Results

Heats
Qualification: First 2 in each heat (Q) and the next 2 fastest (q) advance to the Semifinals.

Semifinals
Qualification: First 3 in each heat (Q) and the next 2 fastest (q) advance to the Final.

Final

References

2023 European Athletics Indoor Championships
800 metres at the European Athletics Indoor Championships